Marta Majowska (17 July 1911 – 17 February 2001) was a Polish gymnast. She competed in the women's artistic team all-around event at the 1936 Summer Olympics.

References

1911 births
2001 deaths
Polish female artistic gymnasts
Olympic gymnasts of Poland
Gymnasts at the 1936 Summer Olympics
Sportspeople from Chorzów